Lionheart is a 2016 American boxing film short  written and produced by Oscar DeRosa and Orlando Cicilia III. The film stars Oscar DeRosa and Marc Macaulay. The film portrays struggling professional boxer Max Rossi who is finally presented with the fight he's been waiting for that will launch his career to the next level but when he is suddenly confronted with a life-changing opportunity he must decide which path to take.

References

External links

2016 films
American drama short films
2010s sports drama films
American sports drama films
American boxing films
Films set in Pennsylvania
Films set in Philadelphia
Films shot in Miami
2016 drama films
2010s English-language films
2010s American films